World Financial Group (WFG) is a multi-level marketing financial and insurance services company based in Johns Creek, Georgia, a suburb of Atlanta, which sells investment, insurance, and various other financial products through a network of distributors in the United States, Canada, and Puerto Rico. It is wholly owned by Dutch life insurance multinational Aegon and operates primarily under the Transamerica brand in the United States.
 
World Financial Group associates are compensated by selling financial services products and receiving commission overrides from people that agents sponsor into the company.

History
 
World Marketing Alliance (WMA) was founded by Hubert Humphrey after he left Primerica in 1991. The original name was Alexander, Inc. but shortly thereafter was renamed World Marketing Alliance. The original idea was that the baby boomers needed a solution for wealth creation and tax protection, and that the "buy term and invest the difference" philosophy of Primerica (formerly A.L. Williams) could be better addressed with variable universal life insurance.
 
While in A.L., Humphrey created and introduced the Business Format System (BFS), a business sales and recruiting methodology. Humphrey continued to develop the methodology in WMA. MD TV, the company's private satellite television network, was also introduced during this period. The company expanded its operations to Canada, Taiwan, Mexico, Puerto Rico, Guam and the Philippines. The company held its first convention in Las Vegas in 1992. It was attended by about 2,000 associates.
 
On March 23, 1998, WMA Executive World Headquarters opened in Duluth, Georgia. The  building housed 500+ employees.
 
In November 1998, WMA was fined $100,000 "for not properly supervising its sales agents" after their clients lost nearly $2 million in unregistered investments. In 2000, WMA was fined $125,000 "for failing to report nearly 900 customer complaints".
 
In June 2001, select assets of WMA were purchased by AEGON and renamed World Financial Group, Inc. Humphrey retained WMA Mortgage Services, Inc. and the original logo, which was used in his subsequent companies World Leadership Group and Hegemon Group International. As part of the conditions of sale, Humphrey was placed on a noncompete agreement and could not compete in the insurance industry until 2013. Following the sale of WMA to Aegon, Alexander Wynaendts, chief executive of AEGON, was quoted as saying, "When we took the company over, we put in place very strict regulatory and compliance procedures".
 
In 2015, John Hancock Financial, a Boston-based insurance company, acquired 1,100 advisors from Transamerica World Financial Group. 
 
World Financial Group has over 3,500 offices in the United States. The World Financial Group Canadian division, World Financial Group Insurance Agency of Canada Inc., moved to Toronto, Ontario in February 2012. In 2008, World Financial Group had over 80 Canadian offices and over 1,500 agents. On July 1, 2013, WFG Securities of Canada, Inc. changed its name to Transamerica Securities, Inc.
 
As of 2022, there are approximately 53,200 independent life insurance agents associated with WFGIA in the United States and its affiliated insurance agency operating in Canada.

In September 2022, the World Financial Group Agency of Canada (WFGIAC) renewed its sponsorship of the 2022 Pinty’s Grand Slam of Curling. 

In November 2022, Transamerica appointed Todd Buchanan President of World Financial Group Insurance Agency, LLC (WFG), Senior Vice President at Transamerica, and head of Transamerica Financial Advisors, Inc. (TFA).

Provider companies
WFG works with hundreds of product provider companies, including mutual funds and unit investment trusts, and various insurance and financial services-related companies.

Regulatory issues
 In December 2006, WGS and one of its brokers were fined $150,000 by Missouri's commissioner of securities for "making unsuitable sales of variable annuities".
 In April 2007, WGS was fined $50,000 for failing to supervise its representatives in the State of Utah, who were misrepresenting their credentials and services rendered during free lunch seminars targeting seniors.
 In October 2014, WFG fined $700,000 by FINRA for failing to supervise registered reps in Dallas.
 In May 2016, MFDA accepts settlement agreement of $60,000 with WFG Securities for contraventions of the By-Laws, Rules, or Policies of the MFDA.
 In January 2018, 12 life insurance agents who worked together at the same WFG brokerage in British Columbia, Canada had lost their licences because they all conspired to cheat on their qualification tests, according to the provincial regulator. In response, the company suspended the agents and noted that the agency would be "taking all necessary steps regarding the matter. In December 2018, 12 former Mississauga WFG agents were fined $865,000 for falsifying KYC (know your client) information of a total of 95 documents, and committing other offences to facilitate leveraging investments.  They also failed to cooperate with MFDA summons for interviews.

References

External links
 

2001 establishments in Georgia (U.S. state)
Companies based in Fulton County, Georgia
Financial services companies established in 2001
Financial services companies of the United States
Multi-level marketing companies